Serena Clerici (born 27 December 1971) is an Italian voice actress. She contributes to voice characters in cartoons, anime, movies, and other contents. Her most known roles are May in Pokémon, Marucho in Bakugan and Dorami in Doraemon.

Voice work

Anime & Animation
 Dorami in Doraemon
 My Melody in Onegai My Melody
 Baby Hugs & Swift Heart Rabbit in Care Bears
 Amy Rose in Sonic X Haruka (May) in Pokémon Haruka (May) in Pokémon: Jirachi Wish Maker Haruka (May) in Pokémon: Destiny Deoxys Haruka (May) in Pokémon: Lucario and the Mystery of Mew Haruka (May) in Pokémon Ranger and the Temple of the Sea Twist in My Little Pony: Friendship Is Magic Aiko Senoo in Ojamajo Doremi Marucho Marukuro in Bakugan Battle Brawlers Marucho Marukuro in Bakugan Battle Brawlers: New Vestroia Marucho Marukuro in Bakugan: Gundalian Invaders Marucho Marukuro in Bakugan: Mechtanium Surge Pip in Yu-Gi-Oh! Zexal Ms Tweezer in ChalkZoneVideo Games
 Amy Rose in Sonic Generations''

References

External links
 

1971 births
Living people
Italian voice actresses